A Plectron is a specialized VHF/UHF single-channel, emergency alerting radio receiver, used to activate emergency response personnel, and disaster warning systems. Manufactured from the late 1950s, through the late 1990s, by the now defunct Plectron Corporation in Overton, Nebraska, hundreds of thousands of these radios were placed in homes of first responders across all of North America. This included ambulance crews, full-time and volunteer firefighters, off-duty specialized police response teams, Civil Defense members, and search and rescue teams.

A Plectron's main feature (distinguishing it from a regular squelched radio) was its selective de-squelching. It would only sound when a correct pair of tones were broadcast - allowing many agencies (with different tones) to share the same frequency. Some Plectron Models had a set of "Built-in Re-chargeable Batteries", for this made the Plectron Portable. The Motorola MINITOR pager also uses this function and has largely replaced the Plectron.

See also
Motorola
Motorola MINITOR pager
Pager
Radio
Communication
Firefighting
Dispatching

References
 Bob Parnass, AJ9S (October, 1999). Plectron R-700 Monitor Receivers. Monitoring Times magazine (monthly periodical).

External links
"Add a Plectron or Motorola Alert Desktop Monitor Receiver to Your Scanner Collection" by Bob Parnass, AJ9S.
Plectron discussion group

Radio electronics